Hassard is an unincorporated community in Ralls County, in the U.S. state of Missouri.

History
A oost office called  was established in 1872, and remained in operation until 1895. The community has the name of one Mr. Hassard, a railroad employee.

References

Unincorporated communities in Ralls County, Missouri
Unincorporated communities in Missouri